German submarine U-636 was a Type VIIC U-boat built for Nazi Germany's Kriegsmarine for service during World War II.
She was laid down on 2 October 1941 by Blohm & Voss, Hamburg as yard number 612, launched on 25 June 1942 and commissioned on 20 August 1942 under Oberleutnant zur See Hans Hildebrandt.

Design
German Type VIIC submarines were preceded by the shorter Type VIIB submarines. U-636 had a displacement of  when at the surface and  while submerged. She had two shafts and two  propellers.

U-636 was fitted with five  torpedo tubes (four fitted at the bow and one at the stern), fourteen torpedoes, one  SK C/35 naval gun, 220 rounds, and one twin  C/30 anti-aircraft gun. The boat had a complement of between forty-four and sixty.

Service history
The boat's career began with training at 5th U-boat Flotilla on 20 August 1942, followed by active service on 1 April 1943 as part of the 11th Flotilla, operating from Bergen, Norway. Just six months later, she transferred to 13th Flotilla stationed in Trondheim, Norway, for the remainder of her service.

Fate
All hands were lost.

Wolfpacks
U-636 took part in eleven wolfpacks, namely:
 Iller (12 – 15 May 1943)
 Donau 1 (15 – 26 May 1943)
 Isegrim (1 – 7 January 1944)
 Donner (11 – 20 April 1944)
 Donner & Keil (20 April – 2 May 1944)
 Trutz (28 June – 10 July 1944)
 Dachs (1 – 5 September 1944)
 Zorn (26 September – 1 October 1944)
 Grimm (1 – 2 October 1944)
 Panther (16 October – 10 November 1944)
 Stier (4 – 15 December 1944)

Summary of raiding history

See also
 Convoy SC 130

References

Bibliography

External links

German Type VIIC submarines
1942 ships
U-boats commissioned in 1942
Ships lost with all hands
U-boats sunk in 1945
U-boats sunk by depth charges
U-boats sunk by British warships
World War II shipwrecks in the Atlantic Ocean
World War II submarines of Germany
Ships built in Hamburg
Maritime incidents in April 1945